Final results for the Team Handball competition at the 2000 Summer Olympics:

Medal summary

See also

 Handball at the 2000 Summer Olympics – Men's tournament
 Handball at the 2000 Summer Olympics – Women's tournament

References

External links
 International Olympic Committee medal database
 Men's final standings
 Women's final standings

 
2000
2000 in handball
2000 Summer Olympics events